Abronia is a genus of lizards in the family Anguidae. The genus is native to northern Central America, occurring mainly in Guatemala and Mexico. However, there are species that occur as far south as El Salvador and Honduras, for example, A. montercristoi. Abronia species are almost exclusively arboreal. These lizards possess intriguing physical traits such as keeled body scales, patterns on each individual scale, and some, for example, A. lythrochila, even have spikes on the back of the head. Traits vary from species to species.

Species
These species are recognized as being valid:
Abronia antauges  – Mount Orizaba alligator lizard
Abronia anzuetoi  – Anzueto's arboreal alligator lizard
Abronia aurita  – Cope's arboreal alligator lizard
Abronia bogerti  – Bogert's arboreal alligator lizard
Abronia campbelli  – Campbell's alligator lizard
Abronia chiszari  – Chiszar's arboreal alligator lizard
Abronia cuchumatanus  – Cuchumatanes alligator lizard
Abronia cuetzpali 
Abronia deppii  – Deppe's arboreal alligator lizard
Abronia fimbriata 
Abronia frosti  – Frost's arboreal alligator lizard
Abronia fuscolabialis  – Mount Zempoaltepec arboreal alligator lizard
Abronia gadovii  – Gadow's alligator lizard
Abronia gaiophantasma  – brilliant arboreal alligator lizard
Abronia graminea  – Mexican alligator lizard
Abronia juarezi  – Sierra Juarez alligator lizard
Abronia leurolepis  – smoothback arboreal alligator lizard
Abronia lythrochila  – red-lipped arboreal alligator lizard
Abronia martindelcampoi  – Martín del Campo's arboreal alligator lizard
Abronia matudai  – Matuda's arboreal alligator lizard
Abronia meledona 
Abronia mitchelli  – Mitchell's arboreal alligator lizard
Abronia mixteca  – Mixtecan arboreal alligator lizard
Abronia montecristoi  — Monte Cristo arboreal alligator lizard
Abronia monticola 
Abronia moreletii  – Morelet's alligator lizard
Abronia morenica  – Sierra Morena arboreal alligator lizard
Abronia oaxacae  – Oaxacan arboreal alligator lizard
Abronia ochoterenai  – Ochoterena's arboreal alligator lizard, Northern Chiapas arboreal alligator lizard,
Abronia ornelasi  – Ornelas's arboreal alligator lizard, Cerro Baul alligator lizard
Abronia ramirezi  – Ramirez's alligator lizard
Abronia reidi  – Reid's arboreal alligator lizard
Abronia salvadorensis   — Salvador arboreal alligator lizard
Abronia smithi  — Smith's arboreal alligator lizard
Abronia taeniata  – banded arboreal alligator lizard, bromeliad arboreal alligator lizard
Abronia vasconcelosii   — Bocourt's arboreal alligator lizard
Abronia viridiflava  — dwarf alligator lizard
Abronia zongolica

References

External links

Abronia
Lizard genera
Lizards of Central America
Taxa named by John Edward Gray